Laura Mañá Alvarenga (born 12 January 1968) is an actress, film director and screenwriter. She was born in Barcelona. As an actress, she has worked for directors such as Bigas Luna or Vicente Aranda. In 1997 she directed Paraules, her first short film and in 2000 her first feature film, Sexo por compassion, selected at the Sundance and Toronto film festivals and awarded at the Malaga Film Festival (Best Film and Audience Award) and at the Festival de Miami (Best Screenplay), among others.

Filmography

As a director and screen writer
Paraules, 1997
Sexo por compasión, 2000
Killing Words, 2003
Morir en San Hilario, 2005
 Te quiero, imbécil, 2020
 Un novio para mi mujer, 2022

As an actress
Lolita al desnudo, 1991
La Teta y la luna, 1994
Pizza Arrabbiata, 1995
Libertarias, 1996
Romasanta, 2004

References

External links

1968 births
Living people
Actresses from Barcelona
Spanish film directors
Spanish women film directors
Spanish women screenwriters
20th-century Spanish actresses
21st-century Spanish actresses